Point-to-point, point to point, or port to port may refer to:

Technology
 Point-to-point construction, an electronics assembly technique
 Point-to-Point Protocol (PPP), part of the Internet protocol suite
 Point-to-point (telecommunications), a telecommunications link connecting two nodes
 Fibre Channel point-to-point, a simple connection topology

Other uses
 Point-to-point (steeplechase), a form of horse racing over fences, practiced by hunting horses and amateur riders
 Point-to-point transit, a route structure common among low-fare airlines
 Premium Point-to-Point Bus Service, an express bus service in the Philippines
 "Point to Point", a song by Animals as Leaders from their self-titled debut album, 2009

See also

 Peer-to-peer